Nola is a Croatian rock band from Pula, Croatia, formed in 1993. Later in 1994, the group released their debut studio album, Nola.

Band members
Current members
Gabrijela Galant Jelenić – lead vocals 
Marijan Jelenić – guitar 
Dean Vitasović – bass guitar 
Robert Slama – drums

Discography

Albums
 Nola (1994)
 Dio tebe (1995)
 Osmijeh (1997)
 Iznad oblaka (2009)
 Piano (2012)
 Negdje između (2017)

Singles

Awards and nominations

References

External links

Croatian rock music groups
Musical groups established in 1993
1993 establishments in Croatia